Mount Olive is an unincorporated community in Ashley County, Arkansas, United States.

References

Unincorporated communities in Ashley County, Arkansas
Unincorporated communities in Arkansas